5'-AMP-activated protein kinase subunit gamma-3 is an enzyme that in humans is encoded by the PRKAG3 gene.

Function 

The protein encoded by this gene is a regulatory subunit of the AMP-activated protein kinase (AMPK). AMPK is a heterotrimer consisting of an alpha catalytic subunit, and non-catalytic beta and gamma subunits. AMPK is an important energy-sensing enzyme that monitors cellular energy status. In response to cellular metabolic stresses, AMPK is activated, and thus phosphorylates and inactivates acetyl-CoA carboxylase (ACC) and beta-hydroxy beta-methylglutaryl-CoA reductase (HMGCR), key enzymes involved in regulating de novo biosynthesis of fatty acid and cholesterol. This subunit is one of the gamma regulatory subunits of AMPK. It is dominantly expressed in skeletal muscle. Studies of the pig counterpart suggest that this subunit may play a key role in the regulation of energy metabolism in skeletal muscle.

References

Further reading 

 
 
 
 
 
 
 
 
 

EC 2.7.11